Boot camp may refer to:

Training programs 
 Boot camp (correctional), a type of correctional facility for adolescents, especially in the U.S. penal system
 Boot camp, a training camp for learning various types of skills
 Dev bootcamp, a defunct computer programming technical school
 Fitness boot camp, a type of physical training program
 Military recruit training
 Coding bootcamp, bootcamp for teaching programming skills

In arts, entertainment, and media

Literature
 Boot Camp (Muchamore novel), by Robert Muchamore
 Boot Camp (novel), by Todd Strasser

Music
 Bootcamp (band), a 1980s band
 Boot Camp (album), from Lil Soldiers
 "Boot Camp", a track featured on the 1996 Soundgarden album, Down on the Upside

Television
Boot Camp (TV series), a 2001 reality television show
 Boot camp, a stage of competition on the TV series The X Factor

Other uses in arts, entertainment, and media
 Boot Camp (film), also known as Straight Edge 
Combat School, a Konami video game released in North America as "Boot Camp"

Brands and enterprises
 Boot Camp (software), Apple software for installing an alternative operating system on an Intel-based Macintosh computer
 Billy's Bootcamp, military inspired exercise program by Billy Blanks

See also

 Boot (disambiguation)
 Camp (disambiguation)
 
 Battle camp (disambiguation)
 Boot camp (disambiguation)
 Combat Camp (disambiguation)
 War camp (disambiguation)

fr:Boot Camp